Boys is a  1983 Soviet crime drama made at the film studio Lenfilm, directed by Dinara Asanova (screenplay by Yuri Klepikov).

The premiere of the film took place in the Soviet Union in September 1983.

Plot 
Head of summer sports and labor camp, a graduate of the Institute of Physical Education gathered troubled teens, many of which were registered by the police, and was able to be their friend and a good mentor.

Cast
 Valeriy Priyomykhov as Pavel Vasilyevich Antonov, head of the summer sports and labor camps for troubled teens
 Olga Mashnaya as Margarita Kireyeva
 Alexey Poluyan as Sinitsyn
 Zinovy Gerdt as associated judge
 Yuri Moroz as Kostya
 Yekaterina Vasilyeva as Zaitsev's mom
 Oleg Khorev as Andrei Zaitsev
 Valery Kravchenko as Sinitsyn's father 
 Marina Levtova as Kostya's girlfriend

Awards 
XVIII All-Union Film Festival (Kiev) in a program of feature films for children and youth: 1st prize

Reviews 
  Miloserdova N.  Boys. Feature Film // RusskoeKino. RU. - 01.10.2008.

References

External links

Государственный регистр фильмов
 «Пацаны»: Аннотированный каталог фильмов киностудии «Ленфильм» 1918—2003
 Теле- и художественные фильмы
 Истории и легенды Ленфильма

1983 crime drama films
Russian crime drama films
Films directed by Dinara Asanova
Lenfilm films
Russian teen drama films
1983 films
1980s Russian-language films
1980s teen drama films
Soviet teen drama films